The Gordini T16, also known as Gordini Type 16 is an open-wheel race car, designed, developed and built by French manufacturer Gordini, for Formula One and Formula Two racing categories, between 1952 and 1956.

References

Open wheel racing cars
Formula One cars
Formula Two cars
1950s cars
Cars of France